Sanna Maria Karolin Askelöf (born 5 February 1983 in Stockholm) is a Swedish judoka who competed in the women's half-lightweight category. Being raised by a Swedish father and a Norwegian mother and holding a dual citizenship to compete internationally, Askelof held five national senior titles in her own division, picked up a total of twenty-eight medals in her career, and represented her paternal nation Sweden in the 52-kg class at the 2004 Summer Olympics. Throughout most of her sporting career until 2009, Askelof trained as a full-fledged member of the judo squad for Södra Sports Club in Farsta.

Askelof qualified as a lone judoka for the Swedish squad in the women's half-lightweight class (52 kg) at the 2004 Summer Olympics in Athens, by placing third from the A-Tournament in Tallinn, Estonia. She lost her opening match to Cuba's Amarilis Savón, who successfully scored an ippon and gripped her with a kuzure kami shiho gatame (broken upper four-quarter hold down) at one minute and twenty-seven seconds. In the repechage, Askelof mounted her strength on the tatami to outscore and pin South Korea's Lee Eun-hee thirty-seven seconds into the match, but slipped her medal chance away in a defeat to Belgian judoka and eventual bronze medalist Ilse Heylen by a waza-ari awasete ippon point and a kesa-gatame (scarf hold).

References

External links
 

1983 births
Living people
Swedish female judoka
Olympic judoka of Sweden
Judoka at the 2004 Summer Olympics
Swedish people of Norwegian descent
Sportspeople from Stockholm
20th-century Swedish women
21st-century Swedish women